Lake Wallace is a freshwater lake located in Edenhope in the Wimmera region of Victoria, Australia. The lake is named after William Wallace.

In 1866, Australian cricketer Tom Wills trained a team of Aborigines on the lake's banks. The team played throughout Victoria and New South Wales, and several members formed the Aboriginal team which toured England in 1868.

References

Lakes of Victoria (Australia)
Wimmera catchment
Rivers of Grampians (region)